Cairns is an electoral district in the Legislative Assembly of Queensland in the state of Queensland, Australia.

The division encompasses the central business district and inner-suburbs of Cairns, in Far North Queensland. Major locations include Bungalow, Manoora, Kanimbla, Earlville and Woree.

History
Created in 1888, Cairns has historically tended to be a safe Labor seat with a blue-collar economy based on sugar, mining and railways. However, in recent decades such industry has been surpassed in importance by tourism and service industries for wealthier retirees and has grown increasingly marginal.

This trend culminated in 2012, when Gavin King took the seat for the LNP on a massive swing of over 13 percent, becoming the first conservative to hold the seat since 1904. The seat reverted to its Labor ways in 2015, when Rob Pyne defeated King on a swing slightly larger than the one King picked up three years earlier. Pyne quit the party to become an independent in 2016. He was defeated by Labor's Michael Healy in 2017.

Members for Cairns

Election results

References

External links
 Electorate profile (Antony Green, ABC)

Cairns
Cairns, Queensland